Don Mirault is an American actor.  He played the Coalition leader Hayne in the Star Trek: The Next Generation episode "Legacy".
Mirault guest starred in several television series such as The Golden Girls (1991–1992, with Mitchell Ryan, Kevin Brief, and Warren Munson), Automan (1984, with Robert Lansing and Star Trek video game actor John Vernon), The Pretender (2000, with Barbara Babcock and Melinda Clarke), and CSI: Crime Scene Investigation (2002, with Michael Buchman Silver and Michael Ensign).

Among his many films most notable are Top of the World (1997, with Peter Weller, Cary-Hiroyuki Tagawa, Ed Lauter, and Maria R. Kelly) and Miss Congeniality 2: Armed and Fabulous (2005, with William Shatner, Diedrich Bader, Faith Minton, L. Sidney, Chuck Hicks, and Darlene Williams).

As well as being a notable actor Mirault is also the sole-proprietor of Rafter Publishing. He has written, edited and distributed a variety of different books for publication. The author of many corporate presentations, he wrote, cast and trained numerous presenters for the Lion Habitat at the MGM Grand Las Vegas.
He appeared on Broadway as Zach in A Chorus Line and in Bob Fosse's Chicago. He performed the lead adagio in the “Folies Bergere” in Las Vegas. Mirault has worked in every dance medium from Cruise Lines to MTV. He is the creator of Virtualdanceclass.com where teachers have access to class combinations from Professionals and Studio Teachers. Mirault has created three instructional videos "Lifts...For Your Choreography", "Lifts...For Kids" and "Advanced Lifts and Partner Work." He conducts adagio classes across the country specializing in helping male dancers and partners. A keynote speaker at colleges and universities, Mirault continues to educate dancers and teachers on the business of dance and how to become a professional. Ear Prompter and Teleprompter proficient; Mirault is a spokesperson for many Fortune 500 Companies, Game shows and Special Events

Filmography
Miss Congeniality 2: Armed & Fabulous (2005) .... Griffin 
CSI: Crime Scene Investigation .... Ken Murdock (1 episode, 2002)
... a.k.a. CSI: Las Vegas (South Africa: English title: informal alternative title) (USA: syndication title)
... a.k.a. C.S.I. (USA: short title)
... a.k.a. CSI: Weekends (USA: promotional title)
... a.k.a. Les experts (Canada: French title)

The Accused Is Entitled (2002) TV episode .... Ken Murdock
One World .... Father (1 episode, 2000)
One of Our Own (2000) TV episode .... Father
The Pretender .... Don the Sweeper (1 episode, 2000)
Meltdown (2000) TV episode .... Don the Sweeper
Top of the World (1998) .... Surveillance Technician #1
... a.k.a. Cold Cash
... a.k.a. Showdown

Secret Places (1996) .... Howard
Saved by the Bell: The College Years .... Sky Diving Instructor (1 episode, 1994)
Love and Death (1994) TV episode .... Sky Diving Instructor

The Golden Girls .... Ron / ... (2 episodes, 1991–1992)
Journey to the Center of Attention (1992) TV episode .... Ron
The Bloom Is Off the Rose (1991) TV episode .... Skydiving Instructor

Star Trek: The Next Generation .... Hayne (1 episode, 1990)
... a.k.a. Star Trek: TNG (USA: promotional abbreviation)
Legacy (1990) TV episode .... Hayne

Knots Landing .... Reporter (1 episode, 1990)
If I Die Before I Wake (1990) TV episode .... Reporter

Valerie" .... Larry (1 episode, 1989)
... a.k.a. The Hogan Family (USA: new title)
... a.k.a. Valerie's Family (USA: new title)
Educating Rita (1989) TV episode .... Larry

Automan .... Robin Hood (1 episode, 1984)
Zippers (1984) TV episode .... Robin Hood

References

American male actors
Living people
Place of birth missing (living people)
Year of birth missing (living people)